Minimizing Marriage: Marriage, Morality, and the Law  is a 2012 book by Elizabeth Brake in which the author provides an "in-depth examination of marriage, within the context of contemporary ethical and political theory."

Reception
The book was reviewed in Ethics, Hypatia, Humana Mente – International Journal of Philosophical Studies, Notre Dame Philosophical Reviews, Philosophy in Review, Reason, Res Publica, Social Theory and Practice, Journal of Applied Philosophy, The Philosopher’s Magazine, Journal of Homosexuality, and APhEx Portale Italiano di Filosofia Analitica Giornale di Filosofia.

References

External links 

2012 non-fiction books
Ethics books
Oxford University Press books
Books in political philosophy
Books about the philosophy of sexuality
Books about marriage
Books about same-sex marriage